Svetlana Bečić (born 13 August 2002) is a Montenegrin footballer who plays as a midfielder for Women's League club ŽFK Budućnost Podgorica and the Montenegro women's national team.

Club career
Bečić has played for Budućnost Podgorica in Montenegro.

International career
Bečić capped for Montenegro at senior level during the UEFA Women's Euro 2022 qualifying.

References

2002 births
Living people
Montenegrin women's footballers
Women's association football midfielders
ŽFK Budućnost Podgorica players
Montenegro women's international footballers